George Henry Fletcher (7 September 1879 – 8 June 1958) was a British communist activist and baker.

Life
Born in Horncastle in Lincolnshire, Fletcher completed an apprenticeship as a baker and, after a short period working as a miner, found work at Simmersons bakery in Sheffield.  There, he started a branch of the Amalgamated Union of Operative Bakers, and became its chair.

In 1898, Fletcher joined the Sheffield Socialist Society (SSS), and around this time, he also started a small bakery of his own.  In 1902, he worked with other SSS members to form a branch of the Social Democratic Federation (SDF).  He was an agreed joint Labour candidate in the 1905 local elections in Burngreave, losing by only four votes.  He also began speaking regularly at open air meetings for the party.  In 1910, he was fined 40 shillings for speaking in High Hazels Park; soon after, he was sentenced to 56 days in prison for speaking in Hillsborough Park.

Fletcher was elected to the executive committee of the Sheffield Trades and Labour Council in 1914, and as vice-chair in 1915.  He organised anti-war rallies, and was prominent in the No Conscription Fellowship.  He also played a role in supporting the Sheffield Workers' Committee, and was prominent in the bakers' national strike of 1919.

In 1920, Fletcher was a founder of both the Communist Party of Great Britain (CPGB) and the Sheffield National Unemployed Workers Movement.  In 1921, he was sentenced to three months in prison on charges of sedition for speaking in favour of a miners' strike.  Fletcher was later appointed as the treasurer of the National Minority Movement.

Although he was chair of the local CPGB branch, Fletcher was also adopted as a Labour Party candidate, and was elected to the Board of Guardians in 1922, representing Darnall, and acting as the board's treasurer.  He was expelled from Labour in 1928, and then stood for the CPGB in Sheffield Attercliffe at the 1929 and 1931 general elections.  The Board of Guardians was abolished in 1929, and Fletcher stood for Sheffield City Council unsuccessfully that year, then in 1932 and 1935 in Manor, each time taking more than 1,000 votes.

Fletcher's son, also George Fletcher, was a founder member of the Young Communist League in 1921.  In 1923, the two set up a new venture, running bread vans to supply their own shops, which grew into a large and profitable business, which remained in the family until it was sold to Northern Foods in 1999 for £40 million.

Fletcher retired near the start of World War II, continuing to support the CPGB financially.  In his spare time, he was a supporter of Sheffield Wednesday F.C., and would attend their matches most Saturdays. He died in Nottingham in 1958.

Further reading
Nellie Connole Leaven of Life – the story of George Henry Fletcher

References

1879 births
1958 deaths
British bakers
Communist Party of Great Britain members
People from Horncastle, Lincolnshire
Social Democratic Federation members